The Pontifical Council for Social Communications was a dicastery of the Roman Curia that was suppressed in March 2016 and merged into the Secretariat for Communications (now "Dicastery for Communication").

According to Pastor bonus, Pope John Paul II's 1988 apostolic constitution on the Roman Curia, the council was "involved in questions regarding the means of social communication, so that, also by these means, human progress and the message of salvation may benefit secular culture and mores." It worked "to encourage and support" the Church and its members in social communication to imbue mass media "with a human and Christian spirit."

History
First established by Pope Pius XII in 1948 and later given wider jurisdiction and new names by successive popes, most recently by John Paul II on 28 June 1988, it was responsible for using mass media to spread the Gospel.

It was established by the Secretariat of State as the Pontifical Commission for the Study and Ecclesiastical Evaluation of Films on Religious or Moral Subjects and was renamed the Pontifical Commission for Educational and Religious Films later that year. The commission was renamed to the Pontifical Commission for Cinema in 1952, to the Pontifical Commission for the Cinema, Radio and Television in 1954, and became a permanent office of the Secretariat of State in 1959.
It was reorganized as the Pontifical Commission for Social Communications in April 1964.
The commission was renamed Pontifical Council for Social Communications and promoted to a dicastery of the Roman Curia in March 1989.
The council was suppressed in March 2016.

Publications

The  and its predecessor bodies have published a number of statements on various topics connected with social communications, including:

Temas candentes. Respeto a la vida. Pornografía y violencia - Vida artificial - Homosexualidad. (1989). Vatican City: Ediciones Paulinas/ Editorial Salesiana.

In addition, the PCSC helped to draft John Paul II's 2005 apostolic letter The Rapid Development, on technological changes in the media.

List of presidents

See also
 Holy See
 Holy See Press Office
 Index of Vatican City-related articles
 News.va
 The Vatican Today News Portal
 Vatican Television Center

References

External links
Official Vatican website
The Vatican YouTube Channel

 
Mass media in Vatican City
Catholic media
Social Communications
Christian organizations established in 1948
Religious organizations disestablished in 2016
Catholic organizations established in the 20th century
1948 establishments in Italy
2016 disestablishments in Italy
Former departments of the Roman Curia